The Men's 400 metres T13 event at the 2012 Summer Paralympics took place at the London Olympic Stadium from 31 August to 2 September.

Records
Prior to the competition, the existing World and Paralympic records were as follows:

Results

Round 1
Competed 31 August 2012 from 10:55. Qual. rule: first 3 in each heat (Q) plus the 2 fastest other times (q) qualified.

Heat 1

Heat 2

Final
Competed 2 September 2012 at 20:41.

 
Q = qualified by place. q = qualified by time. PR = Paralympic Record. RR = Regional Record. PB = Personal Best.

References

Athletics at the 2012 Summer Paralympics